Green Line 4 of the Mumbai Metro, currently under construction, is part of the metro system for the city of Mumbai, India and is being developed by MMRDA and a consortium of international companies.

The  line is planned to be fully elevated, and is expected to consist of 32 stations from Wadala (Mumbai) to Kasarvadavali (Ghodbunder road, Thane) via Chembur, Bhandup Mulund and Teen Hath Naka, a popular traffic crossing in Thane. It is estimated to cost ₹14,549 crore. Its construction was expected to begin by June 2018.

It is expected to be completed in 2022 and is expected to provide interconnectivity among the existing Eastern Express Highway at Chembur, Central Railway, Mono Rail, the ongoing Metro Line 2B (D N Nagar to Mandale) at Chembur, and the proposed Metro Line 5 (Thane to Kalyan) at Kapurbawdi, Metro Line 6 (Swami Samarth Nagar to Vikhroli) in Kanjurmarg and Metro Line 11 (Wadala to CSMT) in Wadala. It will provide rail based access to the commercial, government bodies and geographical landmarks in Mumbai. Dedicated depots are planned in Owale land in up to an extent of 20 ha. and in Godrej Land in up to 15.50 ha. area. It will reduce the current travel time by between 50% and 75% depending on road conditions. Alstom awarded to provide rolling stock for this line, but the contract has been cancelled in March 2022 due to delays and uncertainties of the project.

Planning
The Maharashtra Cabinet approved the Metro 4 corridor on 27 September 2016. Half of the project cost will be funded by the Centre and the State Government, while the remaining will be financed through loans from the AIIB and the World Bank. The foundation stone for Metro 4 was laid by Prime Minister Narendra Modi on 24 December 2016. The Maharashtra Coastal Zone Management Authority granted Coastal Regulation Zone (CRZ) to the project in February 2017. Over  of the line passes over water bodies in Bhakti Park and Wadala, both areas classified as Coastal Regulation Zone II where CRZ rules limit construction activities. 48 piers are proposed to built in the CRZ II. The MMRDA will construct metro car depots for the line on a 30 hectare plot at Owala village in Thane district and another in Vikhroli.

The MMRDA utilized a drone to carry out survey work for Metro 4. The drones were fitted with 360 degrees camera that provide up to  accuracy. The aerial survey takes less time than a regular survey, achieves greater accuracy and helps protect against false claims for compensation. In March 2017, the MMRDA stated that it was conducting a pre-feasbility study on extending the line from Wadala to Mumbai General Post Office in South Mumbai, via the Mumbai Port Trust. The proposed  extension is estimated to cost 300 crore per km.

In October 2018, the MMRDA announced that it would construct Metro 4 along with three flyovers to ensure smooth flow of traffic, with the metro running on the upper deck of the flyover. The three flyovers will be built at Bhayander Pada, Kasarvadavli and Anandnagar near Ghodbunder.

In May 2019, MMRDA Metropolitan Commissioner R.A. Rajeev announced a modified plan to use Siddharth Colony as the interchange station with Line 2. The original plan had proposed to use the Eastern Express Highway station on Line 2B and Siddharth Colony on Line 4 as the interchange stations. However, the two stations are approximately 480 metres away from Siddharth Colony and the change was made to simplify passenger transfers.

Construction
A consortium of DB Engineering, Louis Berger and Hill International was awarded a project management and construction management services contract for the Metro 4 project in April 2018. The MMRDA invited bids for civil work on the corridor on 4 January 2017. The tenders for construction of viaducts and stations were divided into five packages - Wadala to Amar Mahal Junction, Garodia Nagar to Surya Nagar, Gandhi Nagar to Sonapur, Mulund Fire Station to Majiwada and Kapurbawdi to Kasarvadavali. Metro 4 was tendered alongside Metro 2B. L&T, Afcons Infrastructure, Tata, NCC and JMC, Reliance Infrastructure-RdE, Wenig Incorporation, JKumar Group, ITD Cementation, CHEC-TPL bid for packages on both Metro 2B and Metro 4. A total of 11 firms and/or consortia submitted bids for the two lines, two of whom (Simplex Infrastructures and a consortium of GHEC-RCC-JV-China) bid exclusively for Metro 2B packages.

The construction work was divided into five packages and awarded through the engineering, procurement and construction (EPC) model in April 2018. A joint venture between Reliance Infrastructure and Italian firm Astaldi S.p.A. was awarded three packages between Kasarwadavali and Wadala worth . The contract for the remaining two packages, worth a combined , was awarded to a joint venture between Tata Projects Limited and China Harbour Engineering Company. The civil work is expected to be completed in 30 months.

Whereas, On the Metro 4A project, which is estimated to cost Rs 949 crore will have two stations Gowniwada and Gaimukh which is the extension Route. The Mumbai Metropolitan Region Development Authority (MMRDA) has today issued two contract orders to major infrastructure company J Kumar Infraprojects Limited for construction of Mumbai Metro Line 4A (Kasarwadavali-Gaimukh corridor). Design and construction of elevated viaducts and two stations from Kasarwadavali to Gowinwada and Gowinwada to Gaimukh for the corridor of Mumbai Metro Line 4A (extension of Metro line 4 Wadala to Kasarwadavali of Mumbai Metro Rail Project of MMRDA). The total contract value of the letter of acceptance is Rs 342 crore.

Current status

Stations

Green Line 4 
32 stations are being planned on Line 4. Most of them were either in the stage of planning or under early stages of construction (as of November 2018)

Green Line 4A 
The car depot will be located at Owale.

2 stations are being planned on Line 4A. Connected to word Gaimukh to Kasarvadavali also connect Metro 10

References

Mumbai Metro lines